The Robert Award for Best Song is one of the merit awards presented by the Danish Film Academy at the annual Robert Awards ceremony. The award has been handed out since 2002, bar 2014 and 2015.

Honorees

2000s 
 2002:  for "Little White Doll" in 
 2003:  for "It's Okay" in Okay
 2004: Carpark North for "Transparent & Glasslike" in Midsommer
 2005: Anders Matthesen for "Paranoia" in Terkel in Trouble
 2006: The Raveonettes for "Please You" in Nordkraft
 2008:  for "Lille svale" from Karlas kabale
 2009: Kira Skov for "Riders of the Freeway" in Frygtelig lykkelig

2010s 
 2010: Tina Dickow for "Rebel Song" in Oldboys
 2011: Agnes Obel for "Riverside" in Submarino
 2012:  for "Lille frøken Himmelblå" in Dirch
 2013: Annika Aakjær, Halfdan E, and Søren Siegumfeldt for "Sangen om Gummi T – Hvem ved hvad der er op og ned" in 
 2014: Not awarded
 2015: Not awarded
 2016: Pharfar, Andreas Keilgaard, and Wafande for "Der er kun en som Iqbal" in

References

External links 
  

2002 establishments in Denmark
Awards established in 2002
Film awards for Best Song
Song